Yttrium oxide may refer to:

 Yttrium(II) oxide, YO, a dark brown solid
 Yttrium(III) oxide, Y2O3, a colorless solid